The entire Bible was published in Thai in 1894 and there are currently several translations of the Bible in the Thai language.

Contemporary Translations
Thai translations of the Bible currently in print include the Thai Standard Version (THSV 2011), the Thai New Contemporary Version (NTCV), the Thai King James Version (TKJV), the New Thai Translation Version (New Testament only), the New World Translation of the Holy Scriptures (NWT), and the Easy-to-Read Thai Bible (ERV). A Thai translation of the Apocrypha is also available from Thai Catholic booksellers.

Comparison

History of Thai Bible Translation
The earliest known attempt at a translation of the Bible into Thai is a free translation of the first chapter of the Gospel of Luke, starting at verse 5.  This was translated in 1685 by Louis Laneau of the Paris Foreign Missions Society.

The first Protestant effort at Thai Bible translation was a translation of the Gospel of Matthew by Ann Judson. Karl Gützlaff and Jacob Tomlin, who are regarded as the first two resident Protestant missionaries in Thailand, translated the four Gospels and Romans from Chinese into Thai.  They were assisted by a Chinese man and a Burmese man, both of whom spoke Thai. John Taylor Jones, an ABMU missionary, translated the New Testament from Greek into the Thai language. Part of the Bible in Thai was first published in 1834. Jones' translation of the New Testament in Thai was printed for the first time in 1846. The translation of the Old Testament was finished in 1883 and the Bible with the complete Protestant canon in Thai was published as a single volume for the first time in 1894.  This edition of the Bible was later revised by the Thailand Bible Society using the King James Version (KJV) as the base text and published as the Thai Standard Version in 1940.  This translation was subsequently revised using the Revised Standard Version (RSV) and Authorized Standard Version (ASV) as the base text and republished in 1971.

Jehovah's Witnesses released the New World Translation of the Christian Greek Scriptures for the first time in Thai by 2007. This Christian Greek Scriptures is based from the English 1984 edition of the New World Translation of the Holy Scriptures which was released in 1984 in United States. Few years later, in 2015, a complete Bible with Hebrew Scriptures and revised Christian Greek Scriptures was released in Thai with a new name called: คัมภีร์ไบเบิลฉบับแปลโลกใหม่ (New World Translation of the Holy Scriptures). The Bible is based from the English 2013 revision of the New World Translation of the Holy Scriptures which was released in 2013 in Jersey City, New Jersey, U.S.A. This newly revised edition includes the use of more modern and understandable language (comparison above), clarified Biblical expression, appendixes, and many more.

Other Language Bibles in Thailand
In addition to the Thai Bible, several other language Bible translations are used in Thailand, especially among ethnic minorities.  These include Chinese, Lao, Burmese, Cambodian, Malay, Karen, Akha, Hmong, Lahu, Lawa, and Shan.

References

External links

 Thailand Bible Society Page
 Thai Bible King James Version
 A Brief Survey of Thai Bible Translations by Karl Dahlfred.
 Thai Bible Translations – Peter Passchier's most comprehensive survey, inspired by Dahlfred's page.
คัมภีร์ไบเบิลฉบับแปลโลกใหม่ - New World Translation of the Holy Scriptures

Thai language
Christianity in Thailand
Thai